James Barclay MA (d. 29 December 1750) was a Canon of Windsor from 1724 - 1750.

Career

Barclay was appointed Rector of West Ilsley, Berkshire in 1743.

He was appointed to the twelfth stall in St George's Chapel, Windsor Castle in 1724, and held the stall until 1750.

Notes 

1750 deaths
Canons of Windsor
Year of birth missing